Sportclub Gatow Berlin is a German football club from the district of Gatow, Berlin. It was founded in 1931 as Gatower Sportverein. The club was lost in 1945 in the aftermath of World War II, but reemerged as Sportgruppe Gatow. It readopted its historical identity on 1 April 1949.

The team's best results were a pair of second place finishes in the Amateurliga Berlin (III) in 1964 and 1965, leading to a single season in the second tier Regionalliga Berlin in 1965-66. They spent the balance of the 1960s in the Amateurliga before falling to lower level play. Gatow returned to what had become the Amateur Oberliga Berlin (III) in 1980 where they played for much of the decade and on into the early 1990s. They currently are part of the Landesliga Berlin, Staffel 1 (VII).

Current squad

References 

Club official website
Club profile on FuPa
Club profile on NordBayern

Gatow SC
Berlin Gatow SC
Association football clubs established in 1931